Language and Human Nature is a joint literature project that was begun, but never completed, between C. S. Lewis and J. R. R. Tolkien.

In the 1940s, a news release from Lewis and Tolkien's publisher had announced that the book was to be published in 1950. However, the book was not published, and until 2009, scholars had believed that the draft of the book had never been started. In 2009, Steven A. Beebe, Regents’ Professor and Chair of the Texas State University Department of Communication Studies, discovered the beginning pages of the manuscript in the Oxford University Bodleian Library. Professor Beebe stated: "What is exciting is that the manuscript includes some of Lewis’s best and most precise statements about the nature of language and meaning. Both Lewis and Tolkien wrote separately about language, communication, and meaning, but they published nothing collaboratively."

References

C. S. Lewis
Works by J. R. R. Tolkien